Glyphidrilus is a genus of semi-aquatic freshwater earthworms in the family Almidae. It inhabits freshwater systems like river banks, lakes and rice fields from East Africa to South and South East Asia.

Gallery

References

External links 

Haplotaxida
Annelid genera